Leatherhead is a fictional character in the Teenage Mutant Ninja Turtles comics and all related media. The character first appeared in Tales of the Teenage Mutant Ninja Turtles #6 (August 1988) and was created by Ryan Brown. He is a mutated humanoid-alligator and appears in numerous TMNT versions.

Mirage Comics 
Originally, Leatherhead was nothing more than an infantile alligator that had escaped a robbery at a pet store and found his way into the sewers. While in the sewers, Leatherhead was found by a pair of TCRI Utroms, who decided to bring the creature to their headquarters. During his stay with the Utroms, Leatherhead was exposed to mutagen, which caused him to mutate into a humanoid and intelligent being.

Living with the Utroms, Leatherhead ended up being separated from his "family" when the TCRI building self-destructed. The now-homeless Leatherhead was forced to live in the sewers where he was continually attacked by a big-game hunter called Jack Marlin. During one attack by the hunter, Leatherhead met the Turtles. Aiding Leatherhead in defeating the hunter, the Turtles decided to allow Leatherhead to live in their old home.

Eventually, four Foot Clan ninjas encountered an eye-patch-wearing Leatherhead in the sewers. Fearing that Leatherhead would kill them, the ninjas tried to get on Leatherhead's good side by promising to aid him in creating his Transmat Device. Accepting the help, Leatherhead and the ninja set to work creating the Transmat, only to be interrupted by the Turtles. After a brief skirmish, the Turtles learned that the Foot Ninja were actually helping Leatherhead. Embarrassed by the incident, the Turtles decided to aid the mutant alligator. Eventually, the Transmat Device was complete, so Leatherhead could finally reach the Utrom Homeworld. Unfortunately, instead of teleporting Leatherhead, the device simply blew up in his face. This failure was too much for Leatherhead to handle and in a fit of rage, Leatherhead killed his two Foot assistants and vowed revenge on the Turtles, whom he blamed for wrecking his attempt to get "home".

Leatherhead later resurfaced in Volume 4. He makes an appearance at Master Splinter's funeral. He is then seen wrestling a mutated Raphael in the sewers before swimming off. It is unknown what his current relationship with the Turtles is, but Raphael's comment that he hopes that he did not hurt Leatherhead would make it seem as if they are at least on good terms.

He has also appeared in two issues of Tales of the Teenage Mutant Ninja Turtles Volume 2. In issue #8, a mentally unstable and delusional Leatherhead is discovered by Raphael to be building another Transmat Device. Leatherhead seems to harbor an insane grudge against Donatello and nearly kills Raphael when he mistakes him for Donatello (all four TMNT wear red bandanas in the original appearances). Once the Transmat Device was finished, it suddenly kicked into operation and causes three Utroms to appear; these Utroms blast Leatherhead with a ray gun, and take him away, destroying the Transmat Device as they leave.

In issue #23, the Turtles are recruited by the Utroms to save Leatherhead from a renegade group of Utrom radicals called "The Illuminated", the same ones who took him away in issue #8, in attempts to clone him into an army of mutants to aid in their world "cleansing" agenda. It is revealed that the Illuminated were secretly drugging Leatherhead, which caused him to subconsciously build the second Transmat Device that he was working on in issue #8, then wake up and remember little. It also caused his missing eye to heal and gave him a massive increase in size. The Turtles rescued Leatherhead, defeated the clones and aided in the destruction of the Illuminated. Leatherhead returns to Earth with the Turtles, rather than going back to the Utrom homeworld. These events all take place between volumes 2 and 4 of the Mirage series.

In the past, at several comic conventions, Leatherhead creator Ryan Brown has said that he initially intended to kill the character off at the end of Tales of the Teenage Mutant Ninja Turtles vol. 1 #6 by having the gator-man tumble into the underground gorge with the evil big game hunter, but the Turtles' creator Peter Laird nixed the idea, opting to have Leatherhead survive and return to the sewers with the Turtles.

Brown returned to plot his creation after 19 years in the September 2007 issue of Tales of the TMNT. Out for a swim, Leatherhead encounters a group of aliens called Sigmurethites and attacks them. The alligator-man's Utrom guardian Dr. X, a.k.a. Xeinos the Utrom, also appears in this issue in a female scientist's exoskeleton.

Image Comics (Volume 3) 

After two children are found slain and half-eaten in the sewers Leonardo comes to believe that Leatherhead may have been responsible. Tracking down Leatherhead, Leonardo was surprised to find the mutant alligator gagged and bound. Before he could free Leatherhead, Leonardo was attacked by King Komodo and his monitor lizard minions, the actual killers of the children.

Engaging King Komodo in battle, Leonardo successfully managed to kill King Komodo's minions, only to end up being knocked unconscious with his hand bitten off. Waking up hours later, Leonardo managed to free Leatherhead and the two, with help from Michelangelo and Casey Jones, managed to defeat King Komodo.

Afterwards Leatherhead, his feud with the Turtles forgotten, introduced them to Dr. X, an Utrom left behind from when the TCRI building collapsed. Together with Dr. X, Leatherhead managed to assemble a new Transmat Device; unfortunately, when testing it, the signal projected from the device ended up luring a group of Triceratons to Leatherhead's lair.

Engaging the Triceratons in battle with the Turtles and their allies, Leatherhead managed to viciously maul several of them. Unfortunately, while battling the last remaining Triceraton, the Triceraton activated a "portable, short-range matter transponder", and transported Leatherhead and the unnamed Triceraton to parts unknown.

IDW Comics 
Leatherhead makes his debut in the 49th issue of IDW Publishing's comic series. He appears very briefly, telling Dr. Harold and Professor Honeycutt that he had some mutagen that could be used to help heal Donatello.

1987 animated series 
In the 1987 series, Leatherhead is an enemy of the Turtles who fought them on several occasions. He started off as a giant alligator until he swam through a mutagen-polluted (thanks to a previous botched mission by Krang and Shredder, the one that gave birth to the Punk Frogs) part of the swamp, where he mutated to his current humanoid form. He resides in the swamp area of Florida commonly known as the Everglades. He hunted the Turtles' allies, the Punk Frogs (Napoleon, Genghis, Attila, and Rasputin) and then went after them. He then hunted the Turtles on their own turf in the sewer. While he searches for the Turtles, he also meets the Rat King (whom he describes, in a Cajun accent, as "a few shrimp shy of a boatload") and wrestles him to the ground before he tried to fight against the Turtles.

Later, he partnered up with the Rat King, after their attempts to kill each other failed, to eliminate the Turtles.

In one episode called "Night of the Rogues," Shredder hired him and the Rat King, along with Slash, Tempestra, Antrax, Scumbug, and Chrome Dome, to help him and Krang destroy the Turtles. Leatherhead does not return in the "Red Sky" seasons, which had a more serious tone, and it can be presumed that Leatherhead returned to the swamps and is still at large.

His overall clothing is a yellow cargo vest, blue rubber waders (rubber pants that go over boots and regular pants, held up by straps over shoulders), and a beat-up pink hat; he speaks in a Cajun accent. He usually carries bear traps and large crayfish on his person. He is depicted as a survivalist and tracker. Original creator Ryan Brown went back and redesigned his Leatherhead character for this particular incarnation of the Ninja Turtles.

Leatherhead was originally voiced by Jim Cummings who also, coincidentally, went on to voice more of Brown's characters, such as the Dakota Dude and Saddlesore Scorpion from the series Wild West C.O.W.-Boys of Moo Mesa. Peter Renaday voiced him in the episode "Night of the Rogues".

Archie Comics 
In the Archie TMNT Adventures Comics, Leatherhead starts as a poor human named Jess Harley who lived in the swamps of Florida, and became transformed into a mutant alligator when the "witch" Mary Bones (actually the former warlord Cherubae from Dimension X in disguise) used the Turnstone on him. At first, Shredder lures Leatherhead to work with him, until Leatherhead discovers that the Shredder is a villain. Leatherhead later becomes a wrestling hero at the Stump Asteroid and later a member of The Mighty Mutanimals. He and the other members of that group were killed before the end of the Archie Comics run with the Turtles characters.

Ryan Brown, at convention appearances, has stated that his character Jess Harley is an homage to his favorite actor, Lance Henriksen, and is named after two characters from his favorite films, Jesse Hucker in Near Dark and Ed Harley from Pumpkinhead. Henriksen would later go on to voice the Triceraton Zog in the 2012 animated series.

2003 animated series 
In the 2003 series, Leatherhead is shown as a friend of the Turtles and is often referred to as "LH". He is voiced by Frederick B. Owens in seasons 2 and 3 and by Gary K. Lewis in season 4 and 7.

Going back to his original black and white beginnings in the 6th issue of the 1987 Mirage Studios comic Tales of the Teenage Mutant Ninja Turtles, Leatherhead was originally an exotic pet who got flushed down to the sewer, somehow ending up in an Utrom base. After being exposed to the same mutagen that would eventually change the Turtles, Leatherhead became a massive, humanoid crocodile. With intelligence mirroring that of Donatello's, he lived with the Utroms, whom he considered his family. He was accidentally left behind during the Shredder's attack, which forced the Utroms to flee Earth. In his desperation to return to his family, he befriended Baxter Stockman and helped him create a new body, while working on a transmat device so that he could rejoin the Utroms. Leatherhead eventually met and befriended Michelangelo, who found him living in the Turtles' old lair. After a battle between the Turtles and Stockman, Leatherhead learned that Stockman worked for the Shredder and attacked him. The resulting battle caused a cave-in, and despite Michelangelo's pleas for him to follow them, Leatherhead seemingly gave his life for his new friends.

Leatherhead later reappeared, surviving because of his tough skin, as a prisoner and object of experimentation in the lab of Agent Bishop. After being freed by the Turtles, he helped his old friends escape, and for a time lived in the Turtles' lair. However, Leatherhead's animal rages, already dangerous, were made more so by Bishop's experimentation. While in blind animal rage, Leatherhead struck Michelangelo and woke up to believe that he had killed his friend.

Leaving the Turtles, a depressed Leatherhead found himself hunted by an extreme game hunter, Mr. Marlin, through the sewers. Luckily, he was saved by his friends, who refused to give up on him, and was delighted to discover that Michelangelo was alive and well. In the end, he chose to live away from his friends due to his affliction, living in a nearby chamber (an abandoned subway station resembling the Turtles' lair from the second and third TMNT movies) so he would always be nearby, but still able to ensure their safety.

Leatherhead appeared several more times to help the Turtles, primarily in their battles with the Foot and Agent Bishop. He even joined them in attacking the Shredder's secret launch pad and attacked his family's enemy with unmatched fury. However, the Shredder's minion Hun got in the way, and the two fell into the silo. Both survived, and Leatherhead returned to his lair. He is later revealed to have helped Donatello create the Monster Hunter gear used by the Turtles against Bishop's mutant creatures. He is also shown to have formed a deep friendship with Don and is deeply saddened when his friend is mutated and he cannot cure him.

Leatherhead worked together with the other Turtles to capture Donatello. Soon after, he helped them penetrate Bishop's headquarters at Area 51. There, he was forced to fight the mutated Donatello. Reminded of the trauma he had suffered, he was tempted to exact revenge on Bishop, but managed to control his anger with the help of his friends. He then went on to prove his brilliance by using Bishop's resources to devise a cure for Bishop's outbreak, despite his personal grudge against the man.

Leatherhead appears in the Season 7 episode "Wedding Bells and Bytes" as a guest at Casey and April's wedding at Casey's grandmother's farm. He remarks to Angel that he always cries at weddings. During the Foot attack, he helps save the other guests as the barn collapses and then helps fight the Foot.

2012 animated series 
Leatherhead appears in the 2012 Teenage Mutant Ninja Turtles TV series, voiced by Peter Lurie and again an ally to the Turtles.

In the series, Leatherhead was a baby alligator that was owned by a kind boy, until the boy's cruel parents found him and flushed him down their toilet into the sewer. He was discovered there by the Kraang, taken to their dimension, mutated, and experimented on. After suffering long and brutal torture, Leatherhead escaped back through the portal that connected Earth to Dimension X with a piece of the Kraang power cell. Leatherhead took up residence in the sewers, contending with his violent temper and protecting the power cell at all costs. He soon comes across the Turtles, befriending Michelangelo, but after fighting several times alongside his new friends against the Kraang, sacrifices himself to defeat the Kraang and is sent to Dimension X. During his absence, an illusion of Leatherhead is conjured by Sir Malachi during "Mazes and Mutants", played up as the typical fairy-tale dragon for the Turtles to defeat. 

Though only a year passes on Earth, several decades pass in Dimension X, and Leatherhead returns in "Into Dimension X" considerably grayer, leaner, and older. The Turtles enter Dimension X and are elated to reunite with their old friend. Together, they stymie the forthcoming Kraang invasion of New York, and though Leatherhead once again tries to sacrifice himself to save the Turtles, Mikey is able to bring him back home to Earth. Though the Kraang's invasion has been halted for many years in Dimension X, they nevertheless invade Earth within the next few days. Leatherhead personally came to Splinter's aid against the Shredder, violently thrashing him around in his powerful jaws. However, the Shredder hit Leatherhead's pressure points to subdue Leatherhead's superior might, and pummeled him into the sewers.

Half a season later, Leatherhead returns as the second-in-command of the Mighty Mutanimals, a ragtag group of mutants formed by Slash that have been fighting the Kraang invasion since the taking of New York. Leatherhead is overjoyed to be reunited with his friends, especially Michelangelo, and takes part in the battle to evict the Kraang from New York. In "Clash of the Mutanimals", Leatherhead and Pigeon Pete work to free their brainwashed comrades Raphael, Slash, and Rockwell when the Shredder uses them as test subjects for a mind control serum. Leatherhead got a second chance to fight Shredder, but the combined might of the four Turtles and four Mutanimals was only enough to fight Shredder to a draw. In the third-season finale "Annihilation: Earth", Leatherhead nearly attacks Bishop, a defected Kraang, and does not come to trust him until after they work together to take down the Technodrome. Leatherhead takes part in the battle against the Triceraton Empire, but the heroes are unable to save the planet, and Leatherhead is last seen trying to take Rockwell's hand as they are all sucked into a black hole to their deaths. Leatherhead's death is undone thanks to the efforts of the Turtles and Professor Zayton Honeycutt, who go back in time and ultimately prevent the Earth's destruction and Leatherhead's death.

When the Shredder mutated into the Super Shredder, Leatherhead put up a ferocious fight against him once again, and later took part in the clash against the returned Foot Clan. Leatherhead personally killed Rahzar by grabbing him in his jaws and dragging him to the bottom of a river, drowning him. When Splinter fell in battle against the Shredder, Leatherhead and the other Mutanimals attended his funeral in the fourth season finale "Owari". Leatherhead and Karai were later summoned by Mikey to help battle Kavaxas' apocalypse in "End Times", and Leatherhead had the opportunity to bid farewell to the deceased Splinter's spirit once Kavaxas had been defeated.

In The Big Blowout, Leatherhead and the other Mutanimals team up with the Turtles, their 1987 counterparts, April, Casey, Karai and Shinigami to defeat Bebop and Rocksteady, who are recruited by Krang and the 1987 Shredder.

2023 animated film 
Leatherhead will appear in the upcoming 2023 computer animated film Teenage Mutant Ninja Turtles: Mutant Mayhem, voiced by Rose Byrne.

Video game appearances 
Leatherhead made an appearance in Teenage Mutant Ninja Turtles III: The Manhattan Project as a boss in the sewer level; his appearance is that of his action figure. He also appears in both the arcade & SNES versions of Teenage Mutant Ninja Turtles: Turtles in Time, as the boss in the train level; in the Xbox Live Arcade remake, he is voiced by Michael Sinterniklaas. He also appears as the first boss in Teenage Mutant Ninja Turtles: The Hyperstone Heist. In these appearances, his appearance is that of his cartoon counterpart from the original animated series.

Leatherhead has also made an appearance as a boss in Teenage Mutant Ninja Turtles 2: Battle Nexus, although the cutscene shows him as an ally. We see the cave-in caused by Stockman that causes Leatherhead to be buried beneath what remains of the Turtles' old lair. He also is the final combatant in the Monster open Tournament.

In Teenage Mutant Ninja Turtles 3: Mutant Nightmare, Leatherhead is shown in the background in a cutscene near the end of Episode 1. There is no reason given why he is there in space with the Turtles, Casey, and April. In reality, this is because the scene was taken directly from the cartoon, where he was with them for some time. Leatherhead does appear in the DS version of the game as a boss fight and in a level or two where he teams up with the Teenage Mutant Ninja Turtles.

Leatherhead also appears as a boss in the 2014 3DS game voiced by André Sogliuzzo.

Leatherhead appears as a boss in the 2022 beat-'em-up Teenage Mutant Ninja Turtles: Shredder's Revenge. He helps Baxter Stockman, Tempestra, Shredder, and Krang transport the Krang body into the sewers, before fighting the Turtles. He is beaten quickly, but vows revenge.

References 

Comics characters introduced in 1987
Comics characters who can move at superhuman speeds
Comics characters with accelerated healing
Comics characters with superhuman strength
Comic martial artists
Fictional Cajuns
Fictional characters from Florida
Fictional characters from New York City
Fictional characters with superhuman durability or invulnerability
Fictional crocodilians
Fictional humanoids
Fictional mutants
Fictional scientists in comics
Fictional professional wrestlers
Male characters in comics
Teenage Mutant Ninja Turtles characters
Video game bosses